Murali Krishna is a 1964 Telugu-language drama film, produced by V. Venkateswarlu under the Padmasri Pictures banner and directed by P. Pullaiah. It stars Akkineni Nageswara Rao and Jamuna, with music composed by Master Venu.

Plot
Murali (Jamuna) is the only daughter of retired army officer Bhayankar (S. V. Ranga Rao). She falls in love with young and energetic Dr. Krishna (Akkineni Nageswara Rao) and they marry. Murali is impressed by a self-portrait painted by Kantam (Haranath); mistaking him as a woman Murali keeps in contact with him through letters. Surprisingly, one day, Murali gets a letter from him declaring himself a man called Laxmikantam and that he is in love with her. At that moment, Murali's best friend Srilatha (Sharada) tells her to end the matter but she decides to undergo a Srilatha marriage with Kantam. The act makes Murali's life miserable; unfortunately, Kantham is a friend of Krishna and, on learning of the love affair and realising the girl is his wife, he decides to unite them by sacrificing his love.  He quietly serves divorce papers to Murali and leaves the city. Murali collapses and she realizes the truth through Kantam's letter. Nevertheless, she requests Srilatha to marry Kantam and moves to her father Bhayankar's house where she faces his bereavement. In the meantime, Srilatha marries Kantham by narrating him the entire story. On the other side, Krishna establishes a hospital at a remote village and everyone in that area credits him for his amiable nature. Once the Village Zamindar Raghuramaiah (Gummadi) is admitted in the hospital in a serious condition when Krishna saves him. Poornima (Geetanjali) daughter of Zamindar, is a widow loves Krishna. Fortunately, alone Murali lands as a nurse in the nearby town hospital by the name Karuna. Murali & Poornima get acquaintance with each other and becomes good friends. Murali understands Poornima's feeling, she wants to fix her alliance with Krishna without knowing the reality and she too convinces Raghuramaiah. Now Murali steps to talk with Krishna where she gets shocked by seeing him, even though she decides to do so the act. Murali leaves a letter to Krishna regarding the matter and leaves the village. Here Krishna recognizes her handwriting and immediately rushes for her. Eventually, Kantham & Srilatha finds out Krishna's address, reaches there and reveals the truth. Meanwhile, Murali meets with an accident and she has been brought to Krishna's hospital. Dismayed Krishna not able to perform the surgery, Poornima motivates him where he stands up with courage and saves Murali.

Cast
Akkineni Nageswara Rao as Dr. Krishna
Jamuna as Murali
S. V. Ranga Rao as Col. Bhayankar
Gummadi as Raghuramaiah
Haranath as Lakshmikantham
Ramana Reddy as Vaikuntanatha Varma
Allu Ramalingaiah as Koti
Peketi Sivaram as Lakshmikantham's Friend
Suryakantham as Lavanyam
Sharada as Srilatha
Geetanjali as Poornima
L. Vijayalakshmi as Dancer
 Jhansi as Parvatham

Crew
Art: G. V. Subba Rao
Choreography: Vempati Satyam
Dialogues: Acharya Aatreya 
Lyrics: C. Narayana Reddy, Dasaradhi, Acharya Aatreya
Playback: Ghantasala, P. Susheela S. Janaki, Jamuna Rani
Music: Master Venu
Story: P. Radha
Editing:  R. Hanumantha Rao
Cinematography: Madhav Bulbule 
Producer: V. Venkateswarlu
Screenplay - Director: P. Pullaiah
Banner: Padmasri Pictures
Release Date: 14 February 1964

Soundtrack

Music composed by Master Venu. The song "Nee Sukhame Ne Koruthunna" is a blockbuster. Music released on Audio Company.

References

External links
 Murali Krishna film at IMDb.

1964 films
Indian black-and-white films
1960s Telugu-language films
Films directed by P. Pullayya
Films scored by Master Venu